Marcelo Aparicio Mateos (born 25 December 1980 in Usingen) is a retired footballer. He is currently the team leader of Padova.

After retirement
After Mateos retired in the summer 2014, he became the new team leader of the first squad. He remained in the club until 2016, before joining Padova in the summer 2016, also as a team leader.

Appearances on football series 

Lega Pro Prima Divisione : 64 (10)

Lega Pro Seconda Divisione : 108 (12)

Serie D : 122 (25)

Total : 294 (47)

References

External links
 

1987 births
Living people
Italian footballers
F.C.D. Conegliano Calcio 1907 players
Association football defenders